Alexei Sholokhov (born 1975) is a Russian horror writer known for his novels They, The Cellar and The Body. He also was and still is one of the "ghost writers" for Alexander Vargo series.

As Sholokhov once stated in interview for Darker, he had no choice when was offered to publish his novels under Vargo's name. "I wrote these novels in the year 2008 and was trying to place them somewhere during 2009. But I didn't get any result. For instance, people from Eksmo told me that they have no special book series for horrors. But then I was invited to send them my stuff again. I had the only choice: not to be published at all or be published under Vargo's name. And I did my choice"

A bit later Sholokhov has got his personal book series but only three novels were published therein. After that he returned to "Vargo" collective pen name.

Bibliography

As Alexander Vargo:

 2011 Unhuman (Нечеловек)
 2011 Wraith Awakes (Морок пробуждается)
 2012 Electrician (Электрик)
 2013 Eye of a Hanged Man (Взгляд висельника)
 2013 Blame Them in My Death (В моей смерти прошу винить)  (short stories)
 2013 Locked door (Запертая дверь)
 2015 Fragments (Фрагменты)  (short stories)

As Alexei Sholokhov:

 2012 They (Они)
 2012 The Cellar (Подвал)
 2012 The Body (Тело)
 2015 In the night of Halloween (В ночь на Хэллоуин)
 2016 I give you a chance (Я даю вам шанс)

Links
 Sholokhov's official website

References

Russian writers
Living people
Russian horror writers
1975 births